The Kikhchik is a river in the western Kamchatka Peninsula, Russia. It is used for spawning by various species of Pacific salmon.

Course

The Kikhchik is in the Anadyr-Kolyma Basin District.
Its mouth is on the Sea of Okhotsk on the west coast of the Kamchatka Peninsula.

The water is very clear, since many of the tributaries are fed from springs.
Near its mouth the river enters a long, brackish lagoon that is separated from the sea by a sand and pebble spit.
The river flows along this spit, which holds a fishery, for about  before entering the sea.

Name

In the first Russian maps from the beginning of the 18th century the river is named Chikcha, Chikchin, Chiuchin, Kykhchik, etc.
The name probably comes from the Itelmen language hchukyg, meaning "river".

Fish

The Kikhchik is one of the main chum salmon rivers in west Kamchatka, along with the Bolshaya and Icha rivers.
These three rivers are also the main coho streams in the region.
The chum salmon ascend the rivers for spawning between June and September, with the greatest numbers in July or August.
G. V. Belavin worked at Kikhchik from 16 April to 13 September 1929.
He noted that the chinook salmon migration into the river ended around mid-June, while chum salmon were taken in June and continued to migrate until September.

The river is home to several thousand chinook, sockeye, pink, chum and coho salmon.
It also holds large populations of char, freshwater trout and steelhead trout.

Notes

Citations

Sources

Rivers of Kamchatka Krai
Drainage basins of the Sea of Okhotsk